Di Vittorio is a surname of Italian origin. Notable people with this surname include:

 Baldina Di Vittorio (1920–2015), Italian politician
 Giuseppe Di Vittorio (1892–1957),  Italian syndicalist and communist politician
 Salvatore Di Vittorio (born 1967), Italian composer and conductor
 Carlo Roberti de' Vittori (1605–1673), Roman Catholic cardinal